Westport Middle School, formerly known as Westport High School, was founded in October, 1961 as Westport Road High School, on Westport Road on the East Side of Louisville, Kentucky. It serviced students from 7th through 12th grade, with its first class of seniors graduating in 1962. The last class of Seniors graduated in the Spring of 1981, and beginning in the Fall of that year, the school was re-organized as a middle school. Today it services students from 6th to 8th grade..  Westport offers the Montessori Magnet, Advanced Placement, and Honors Programs, as well as their behavioral places are B.R.T or PAC, I.S.S or ISAP.

Jefferson County Public Schools (Kentucky)
Public middle schools in Kentucky
Educational institutions established in 1961
1961 establishments in Kentucky